This is a list of even-toed ungulate species by estimated global population.  This list is not comprehensive, as not all ungulates have had their numbers quantified.

See also
 
Lists of mammals by population
Lists of organisms by population

References

Mammals
ungulates
.